The 2014–15 Egyptian Super Cup was the 12th Egyptian Super Cup, an annual football match contested by the winners of the previous season's Egyptian Premier League and Egypt Cup competition, Ahly defeated Zamalek 5–4 on penalties to claim its 8th Super Cup title.

Match details

References 

Egyptian Super Cup
2014–15 in Egyptian football
ESC
ESC
Egyptian Super Cup 2014